Aiden Leslie (born April 3, 1977) is an American pop singer-songwriter.  He received widespread recognition and acclaim after writing, recording and performing "Worlds Away" in 2011.

Early life
Leslie was born in Ohio.  He attended the School for Creative and Performing Arts in Cincinnati, Ohio.  Shortly after graduating, he moved to New York City to pursue his love for music. There he was cast in an off Broadway play, during which he was introduced to an underground music world he didn't know existed. It wasn't long before he became a fixture in the New York nightlife circuit, frequenting clubs like Palladium, Tunnel, Twilo, Roxy, and Jackie 60 to listen and dance to after-hour DJ's Junior Vasquez and Danny Tenaglia. He found that dance as well as music was lacking the presence of strong male vocalists. "A lot of DJ's are simply not likely to play male artists on their dance floors. I think it’s time that has changed. I want to be a part of the movement to bring more guys to the dance floor".

He currently resides in New York City.

Career
Leslie released the first white label cover of Erasure's "Love to Hate You" in 2005 on JVM Music, remixed by Junior Vasquez.

As a songwriter, Leslie has become known for using his songs as personal diary entries. "Worlds Away" examined the aftermath of struggle, and how people eventually reach a light at the end of the tunnel and grow from adversity. "Trying to Leave Now" looked at fighting feelings in the heart, leaving a love the mind knows is not right.  "Diamond Dreams" reflected on Aiden's story of coming to New York City six days after his high school graduation; how he grew from a boy to a man, navigating his way through the tough city streets, seeking his dreams to become the performer he is today. And, It's become a reality as he has been steadily touring the country the last three years, playing to huge crowds in cities such as Chicago, Miami, New York City, Atlanta, Albany, Columbus, opening for acts such as Wilson Phillips, 10,000 Maniacs, Debbie Gibson, Aaron Carter, and Kristine W to name just a few. "My fans are always my priority and meeting them makes it all worth it" says Leslie.

His newest track, "Nobody Said", continues his journey in search of life's ideal.  It tackles a desire many (including Aiden Leslie) feel is even more out of reach: finding ultimate love.

Aiden Leslie's next release of Please on HMSP Music in 2006 met with favorable reviews.

Leslie released his break out single "World's Away" in February 2011.  "World's Away" rose to No. 1 on Masterbeat, No. 1 on Logo TV "Click List" for four consecutive weeks, and was broadcast in video rotation on MTV , VH1 and was released on iTunes and Amazon.com shortly after.

2011 saw the launch of Leslie's own record label, Ashea Records, which released his next single in July of that year. The pop anthem "Trying to Leave Now", charted number 1 on several pop/dance charts across the globe.

Leslie's next single "Diamond Dreams" was released in August 2012. Leslie's release for 2013 was "Nobody Said" issued in November that year.

Awards
In 2012, Leslie was awarded Odyssey Magazine's Nightlife Best Male Vocalist. He was also nominated for the 2012 Odyssey Magazine's Nightlife Award – Best Male Performer as well as a Glam Award for Best Nightlife Performer.

Discography

Singles

References

External links
Official website

1977 births
American dance musicians
American male singer-songwriters
American gay musicians
American LGBT singers
American LGBT songwriters
Living people
Musicians from Cincinnati
Singer-songwriters from Ohio
Gay singers
Gay songwriters
21st-century American male singers
20th-century American LGBT people
21st-century American LGBT people